Walter Edward Harris,  (January 14, 1904 – January 10, 1999) was a Canadian politician and lawyer.

Harris was first elected to the House of Commons of Canada as the Liberal Member of Parliament (MP) for the Ontario riding of Grey-Bruce in the 1940 election defeating Agnes MacPhail. Despite being a newly elected MP, he enlisted in the military and served for four years, seeing action in France during World War II.

He served as parliamentary secretary to Louis St. Laurent when he was Secretary of State for External Affairs in the Mackenzie King cabinet. He continued as parliamentary secretary to St. Laurent when he became Prime Minister of Canada in 1948 until 1950 when St. Laurent brought Harris into the Canadian Cabinet.

Harris served as Minister of Citizenship and Immigration until 1954 when he was promoted to Minister of Finance. He was Finance Minister during a period of great economic growth. During his term of office, he introduced the regulations permitting "Registered Retirement Savings Plans", which have become a staple of the financial planning of millions of Canadians.

Before his 1956 budget speech, a journalist from the Montreal Gazette played a joke on a colleague from La Presse by pretending that he had received an advance copy of the budget by mistake. Harris was informed of this, and began to draft a letter of resignation until being informed that the whole story was a prank.

Harris also served as Government House Leader from 1953 until 1957, and thus had to try to manage the government's dealings on the floor of the House of Commons during the 1956 Pipeline Debate. The government imposed closure on debate resulting in an outraged parliamentary opposition that complained of "tyranny", and public complaints that the government was acting in an arrogant manner. Harris became a casualty of this, and lost his seat in the 1957 election that brought John Diefenbaker to power.

In 1958, he attempted a move to provincial politics and ran for the leadership of the Ontario Liberal Party. He led on the first ballot of the Ontario Liberal leadership convention but was defeated by fewer than fifty votes by John Wintermeyer on the third ballot. Following his defeat, Harris retired from politics and returned to his law practice. Mr. Harris was also president and later chairman of Victoria and Grey Trust.

Heritage 
The public library in Markdale, Ontario is named after Walter Harris. There is also a school named after him, located in Oshawa, Ontario. This school is part of the Durham District school board and is French Immersion.

There is a Walter Harris fonds at Library and Archives Canada.

References

External links 
 

1904 births
1999 deaths
Members of the House of Commons of Canada from Ontario
Liberal Party of Canada MPs
Canadian Ministers of Finance
Lawyers in Ontario
Canadian Baptists
Members of the King's Privy Council for Canada
20th-century Baptists